Mini-Putt is a simulation of miniature golf developed by Artech Digital Entertainment and released by Accolade for the Commodore 64, MS-DOS, NES and ZX Spectrum in 1987, and Apple IIGS in 1988.

Gameplay
Mini-Putt is played on a variety of courses with traps, ricochets, and unusual green gradations.

Reception
The game was reviewed in 1988 in Dragon #131 by Hartley, Patricia, and Kirk Lesser in "The Role of Computers" column. The reviewers gave the game 3 out of 5 stars.

Reviews
All Game Guide - 1998
ASM (Aktueller Software Markt) - Feb, 1988
Computer and Video Games - Mar, 1988
Nintendo Power - May, 1991
ACE (Advanced Computer Entertainment) - Mar, 1989
ACE (Advanced Computer Entertainment) - Mar, 1988
Isaac Asimov's Science Fiction Magazine v12 n5 (1988 05)

References

External links
Mini-Putt at GameSpot
Review in Compute!
Review in Compute!'s Gazette
Review in Info

1987 video games
Accolade (company) games
Apple IIGS games
Commodore 64 games
DOS games
Game Boy games
Miniature golf video games
Nintendo Entertainment System games
Video games developed in Canada
ZX Spectrum games